Regulator of G-protein signaling 14 (RGS14) is a protein that in humans is encoded by the RGS14 gene.

Function 

RGS14 is a member of the regulator of G protein signalling family. This protein contains one RGS domain, two Raf-like Ras-binding domains (RBDs), and one GoLoco motif. The protein attenuates the signaling activity of G-proteins by binding, through its GoLoco domain, to specific types of activated, GTP-bound G alpha subunits. Acting as a GTPase activating protein (GAP), the protein increases the rate of conversion of the GTP to GDP. This hydrolysis allows the G alpha subunits to bind G beta/gamma subunit heterodimers, forming inactive G-protein heterotrimers, thereby terminating the signal. Alternate transcriptional splice variants of this gene have been observed but have not been thoroughly characterized.

Increasing the expression of the RGS14 protein in the V2 secondary visual cortex of mice promotes the conversion of short-term to long-term object-recognition memory. Conversely RGS14 is enriched in CA2 pyramidal neurons and suppresses synaptic plasticity of these synapses and hippocampal-based learning and memory.

Interactions
RGS14 has been shown to interact with:
 GNAI1 and
 GNAI3.

References

Further reading

External links